Abdusakur "Sakur" Mahail Tan (born July 13, 1950 in Maimbung) is a Filipino politician and former governor of Sulu Province (2007–2013) in the Autonomous Region in Muslim Mindanao.  He currently serves as the Vice Governor of Sulu.

Background
Tan is of Chinese-Tausug descent and was born on July 13, 1950, in Maimbung, Sulu, the eldest child of Hadji Abubakar Tan (former mayor of Maimbung) and Hadja Satriya Mahail.  He attended high school at the Notre Dame of Jolo for Boys and obtained a Bachelor of Arts in 1983 from the Notre Dame of Jolo College.

He is married to Hadja Nurunisah Abubakar-Tan, Jolo"s present Vice Governor - 2016, (daughter of former Jolo mayor Habib Aminkandra N. Abubakar) and has five children.

Political Activity
Tan (LKS-KAM) established a political base in Jolo by aligning himself with the Abubakar and Isquerdo families.  He served first as the municipal councillor of Jolo (1981–87), then as a representative of Sulu's first congressional district (1987–1992) and as governor (in a previous term, 1996–2001).  He lost the 2001 election to MNLF leader Yusop Jikiri but won the governorship a second time in 2007 with 110,715 votes, according to COMELEC data.  In 2010 he won re-election, beating out rivals Munir Arbison and Nur Misuari by over 24,000 votes.

Zamboanga Terrorist Attack
Tan was among 12 persons injured when an improvised explosive device (IED) exploded at the arrival area of Zamboanga International Airport in August 2010.  The attack was suspected to target Tan himself.  The explosion occurred a few days after a suspected member of the regional terrorist group Jemaah Islamiyah (JI), Edgar Malaydan, was arrested in Monkayo, Compostela Valley.

Opposition to ARMM
In a letter addressed to President Aquino, Tan in September 2010 said that the ARMM had failed to bring development or address widespread poverty since its creation more than two decades ago.

References

External links

Biography at the League of Provinces of the Philippines

Lakas–CMD politicians
Filipino Muslims
Governors of Sulu
Members of the House of Representatives of the Philippines from Sulu
1950 births
People from Sulu
Living people
Filipino politicians of Chinese descent
Tausūg people